The Hoboken mayoral election of 2005 is an election that was held on May 10, 2005 in Hoboken, New Jersey for Hoboken residents, in which the Mayor of Hoboken was chosen based on the number of votes. However, none of the five mayoral candidate was able to obtain at least 50% of the vote. The top two vote-getters, David Roberts and Carol Marsh, ran on June 14 in a runoff election, and Roberts won 5,761 to 4,239 (votes). In the May 10 election, Roberts got 39% of the votes and Marsh got 27% of the vote.

There were also 17 people running for 3 at-large seats on the Hoboken City Council, but in the same manner as those running for mayor, no candidate could get a majority, so the 6 people running for council that got the most votes were in the June 14 runoff election (everyone on Robert's team and everyone on Marsh's team). Since the start of the election, there were only 3 spots available on the council, so only 3 of the 17 running for Hoboken City Council (17.6%) would be successful. Those 3 people are now going to be people from Roberts' team. Each position that the candidates were running for is a 4-year term.

There was a miscommunication on the night of May 10, 2005, when the people at Roberts' headquarters announced over a megaphone to a crowd of supporters that Roberts was going to win the election. Either they didn't get the correct information in time, or they came to a conclusion too quickly, because an hour after the announcement it was found that neither Roberts nor Marsh had gained 50% of the vote (which is required).

Evelyn Smith, the vice president of the Hoboken NAACP, came in last with only 289 votes. However, Smith wasn't upset with her defeat, saying "It was pretty much what I expected."

Independent Scott Delea also knew from the very start that his chances of winning were small. The Hoboken Reporter Volume 22 Number 37 said the following about Delea: "[Delea] received an extremely strong showing for a political newcomer. Internet marketing executive Scott Delea obtained [1,336] votes. That total means that about 13 percent of all voters pushed the lever for Delea. With little budget but a strong work ethic, Delea was able to beat out the entire slates of Smith and Russo, which is no small feat." In an advertisement in the Hoboken Reporter Volume 22 Number 36, Scott Delea said the following: "When you vote for a political team, you're voting for people pledged to represent a mayoral candidate's interests. When you vote for an independent, such as myself, you're electing a Council voice that represents your interests." However, despite his attempt, Delea was unable to win.



Campaign slogans 
 Mayor David Roberts - "Roberts Team 2005", "Serving our community"
 Carol Marsh - "Team Hoboken", "Join us to build a better Hoboken"
 Frank "Pupie" Raia - "More parking. More parks. New Leaders", "Shake Up City Hall"
 Michael Russo - "I Like Mike", "Building a Brighter Future for Hoboken", "Courage, Character, Leadership"
 Evelyn Smith - "Unbought and Unbossed"
 Independent Andrew Amato - "Better Management"
 Independent Scott Delea - "Positive Leadership for Hoboken"

Election facts 
 By July 1, 2005, 8 of 9 Hoboken councilmembers will be in support of Roberts
 After losing in the May 10 election, mayoral candidates Frank "Pupie" Raia and Michael Russo endorsed Roberts, which means that most of the people who voted for Raia or Russo voted for Roberts on June 14
 Roberts was seen as the "Old Hoboken" candidate, and Marsh was seen as the reformer
 The Hudson County Democratic Organization gave the Roberts' organizations $277,000 (in 2005)
 The Election fund of senator Kennedy gave the Roberts team $56,800
 The Roberts team raised $913,452
 The Marsh team raised $172,604
 For the Roberts team, $200 was raised per voter. For the Marsh team, $43 was raised per voter.

The ballot numbers (May 10)

Sources 
 The Hoboken Reporter, Volume 22, Number 35
 Hobokeni.com: election

2005 Hoboken mayoral election
2005 New Jersey elections
Hoboken
Mayoral elections in Hoboken, New Jersey